Aliya Batkuldina was a Kazakhstani volleyball player. She is part of the Kazakhstan women's national volleyball team.

She participated in the 2015 FIVB Volleyball World Grand Prix.
On club level she played for Astana in 2015.

References

External links
 http://worldgrandprix.2015.fivb.com/en/finals-3/competition/teams/kaz-kazakhstan/players/aliya-batkuldina?id=44475
 

1995 births
Living people
Kazakhstani women's volleyball players
Place of birth missing (living people)
Volleyball players at the 2014 Asian Games
Asian Games competitors for Kazakhstan
Volleyball players at the 2018 Asian Games
21st-century Kazakhstani women